is a motorsport race track located in Shimotsuma, a neighboring city of Tsukuba, Ibaraki Prefecture, Japan, about  north of central Tokyo.

The track was established in 1966 with the aim of attracting young people to participate in motor sports, but was not actually completed until 1970. At the present time, an event is held every week. The track has a large variety of corners, ranging from wide sweepers to hairpins. The circuit accommodates 8500 spectators on the track, 3000 in the stands, 5000 on lawn seats, and 500 standing over the pits.

The illustration of the course guide shows that there are various courses other than the main course.

 Course 1000

In 2001, the minibike course that had been called the "East Course" was completely renovated and opened as Course 1000 (TC1000), which is almost 1,000 meters in circumference. The TC1000 is a safe course that is open to cars and motorcycles, and features excellent visibility, making it ideal for beginners.

 Gymkhana track

The trapezoid-shaped area just outside the last corner of the main course is the Gymkhana track. Gymkhana is a popular motor sport in Japan, and the All Japan Gymkhana Championships are held by JAF. Practice sessions and Gymkhana competitions are held at the Gymkhana track.

 Oval Course

The Oval Course, located between the first corner and the second hairpin of the main course, is a course for training Auto Race drivers. Auto Race is a unique form of public gambling motor sport in Japan.

Admission is free on weekdays and ¥500 on weekends, but only when there are no scheduled events. Visitors are allowed to drive on the track with a license. Tsukuba Circuit is not convenient to public transportation, so it is best accessed by a private car. The nearest station can only provide access via lengthy taxi ride.

Time Attack
Tsukuba's "Time Attack" event (alternatively known as Super Lap or Tuner Battles) originated in Japan when the tuning media organized the event on race circuits such as Tsukuba, as a proving ground for street tuned cars built at a large budget by highly respected tuning companies. As a result of the quick rise in popularity, tuners developed specialized cars to beat the competition, including the purpose-built HKS CT230R Lancer Evolution with a body made entirely out of carbon fibre. 

Unlike other timed motorsport disciplines such as sprinting and hillclimbing, the car is required to start off under full rolling start conditions following a warm-up lap, where they will have to accelerate out as fast as possible to determine how fast they enter their timed lap. Commonly, as competing cars consist of modified road-going models, that are required to wear tires authorized for road use. Although as time attack cars have gotten fast, due to safety concerns with aerodynamic loads, slicks in faster classes are now common place. 

On 27th January 2023 Yoshiki 'Fire' Ando with the Escort Drag Racing Service Mitsubishi Lancer Evolution IX became the first driver to break through the 50-second barrier at Tsukuba. This was the first time that a tuner car with a production chassis had gone sub-50 seconds on street semi-slick tires. HKS and Nobuteru Taniguchi had gone sub-50 seconds before Ando, with a time of 49.445 seconds and a top speed of 238.253 km/h in the HKS Toyota 86 TRB-03 on slick tires. However, this was largely disputed as a traditional tuner car record since it was set on slick tires. HKS maintains a time of 50.259 seconds in the TRB-03 on traditional semi-slick street tires.

Time Attack top 50 rankings 
The following is the top 50 ranking for tuning car on street tires, as of 12th of February 2023:

Lap records
The outright all-time unofficial track record is 50.230 seconds, set by Kazuyoshi Hoshino in a March 792 Formula Two car, during qualifying for the 1979 Tsukuba Champions race. The fastest official race lap records at the Tsukuba Circuit are listed as:

In popular culture 
Tsukuba Circuit has appeared in numerous video games, including iRacing, Forza Motorsport, 2, 3, and 4, Gran Turismo 4, PSP, 5, 6, 7 and Sport, Tourist Trophy, Enthusia Professional Racing,  rFactor, and D1 Grand Prix.

The track is commonly used for tuner events and has appeared in the final installment of the Shuto Kousoku Trial series, SKT Max. The circuit has also gained popularity because of its use by Best Motoring to test and race a variety of vehicles.

References

External links

Official Webpage (Japanese)
Tsukuba Circuit on Google Maps

Motorsport venues in Japan
Shimotsuma, Ibaraki
Sports venues in Ibaraki Prefecture